Christchurch is a village located at the top of Christchurch Hill in the Caerleon ward and community of the city of Newport, South Wales. The top of the hill affords panoramic views both towards the Bristol Channel in the south and through the Vale of Usk and into the Monmouthshire countryside to the north. The road, which runs along the crest of the hill, runs westwards to Newport and eastwards towards Caerleon and Catsash.
 
The parish church is Holy Trinity. Christchurch has a modern purpose-built village hall and the Christchurch Music Society is a vibrant amateur musical theatre group. Due to its elevated position, the hill is home to the Christchurch transmitter, located near the Celtic Manor Resort.

The church has a Norman doorway with columns five feet high. The axis of the chancel is set in a more southerly direction to that of the nave. In the churchyard is the grave of Captain William Howe, skipper of the packet "Welsh Prince", which is portrayed in a carving at the head of his tombstone.

History
In 1648, during the English Civil War, Oliver Cromwell's troops camped overnight on Christchurch Hill overlooking Newport before their attack on Newport Castle the next day. A cannonball dug up from a garden in nearby Summerhill Avenue, dating from this time, now rests in Newport Museum. Cromwell's men smashed all of the stained glass in the church, except for one tiny orange-coloured pane which remains in the east window.

A tombstone in the north aisle of the church, near the door, is carved with a woman's head, dated 1712 and known as "The Beauty of Chistchurch". Through the ages, on the eve of Corpus Christi, sick children would be brought to be cured by the "Healing Stone of Christchurch", a long narrow grave-stone in the chancel, dated 1376 and dedicated to Johannes Colber and his wife Isabella. The custom led eventually to a system of bribes and profiteering, until it came to an abrupt end, following the intervention of Squire Van of Llanwern, in about 1810.

In the early morning of 6 November 1949 the church was discovered to be on fire. Although the vicar succeeded in saving the church records and the ancient chalice, the entire building, apart from the walls and tower, was destroyed. A week later St John's Church in Maindee suffered a similar fate. The fire, Newport's most disastrous for many years, was estimated to have done damage valued at £30,000 (equivalent to £ in ), The roof had recently been thoroughly repaired. The fact that the previous evening had been Guy Fawkes Night was regarded as mere coincidence. "The Beauty of Christchurch" survived the fire but was accidentally destroyed during the reconstruction of the church.

Christchurch is the location of one of Newport's large municipal cemeteries, north of Christchurch Road overlooking Caerleon.  Nearby once stood Christchurch Junior School.

Christchurch has a War Memorial, to combatants of World War I and World War II, directly in front of the church, and a public house, The Greyhound Inn, opposite.

References

External links

Photos of Christchurch and surrounding area on geograph.org.uk

Districts of Newport, Wales
Villages in Newport, Wales
Hamlets in Wales
Landmarks in Newport, Wales